The year 1669 in music involved some significant events.

Events
February 17 – Première of Alessandro Melani's opera L'empio punito at the Teatro di Palazzo Colonna in Rome.  The work was commissioned by Marie Mancini.

Publications
Luigi Battiferri – Ricercari, Op.3
Giovanni Maria Bononcini – Op. 3, a collection of sonatas in canon
Henri Dumont – Cinq messes en plain-chant
Johann Caspar Kerll – Delectus sacrarum cantionum, 26 motets for 2–5 voices, 2 violins and basso continuo
Henry Lawes 
Select Ayres and Dialogues
The Treasury of Musick
Samuel Capricornus 
Continuatio theatri musici 
Scelta musicale 
Theatrum musicum 
Giovanni Antonio Pandolfi – Sonate cioè balletti, sarabande, correnti, passacagli, capricetti e una trombetta...
Maurizio Cazzati – Varii, e diversi capricci per camera, Op. 50

Classical music 
Johann Schmelzer – Sonata a 4, La Carolietta

Opera
Francesco Cavalli – Coriolano
Antonio Cesti – Genserico
Antonio Draghi – Achille in Sciro
Jean-Baptiste Lully – Monsieur de Pourceaugnac, LWV 41

Births
April 6 – Johann Christopf Faber, composer, organist, and organ builder (died 1742)
February 2 – Louis Marchand, organist, harpsichordist and composer (died 1732)
August 24 – Alessandro Marcello, composer (died 1747)
October 10 – Johann Nicolaus Bach, composer (died 1753)
October 13 – Charles Desmazures, composer (died 1736)
date unknown 
Johann Samuel Beyer, composer (died 1744)
Miquel López Sebastián, composer (died 1723)

Deaths
April 6 – Lars Wivallius, librettist (born 1605)
April 17 – Antonio Bertali, violinist and composer (born 1605)
May? – Étienne Richard, composer, organist and harpsichordist (born c.1621)
October 14 – Antonio Cesti, opera composer (born 1623)
October 28 – Agustin Moreto y Cavana, poet (born 1618)
date unknown
Richard Ayleward, musician and composer (born 1626)
Christopher Simpson, viola da gamba player and composer (born c.1605)
probable – Étienne Moulinié, composer (born c.1600)